Aisa Khan Sampson-Spencer (born 1 April 1992), known professionally as Merky ACE, is a British grime MC, rapper, songwriter and record producer from Lewisham, South London. He was a founding member of the grime collective Family Tree, and later Tizzy Gang, with whom he is still a part of. He also produces beats under the pseudonym Splurt Diablo. His debut album, Blue Battlefield, was released on 3 April 2011.

Career
Merky ACE first came to prominence on the UK underground scene as part of grime's "new wave" in 2011. In the same year he independently released his acclaimed Blue Battlefield mixtape and followed it up with the Catch Up EP in the same year. In 2012, Merky ACE recorded features for Dizzee Rascal's Dirtee TV 2 mixtape which was released on Christmas of that year. In 2013, he released two mixtapes - All or Nothing and Play Your Position - through grime label NoHatsNoHoods.

In 2014, Merky ACE was signed to Dizzee Rascal's label Dirtee Stank. Merky ACE's first project on the label Peak Levels EP was released on 17 July 2015. In late 2015, Merky ACE formed a new crew, Tizzy Gang alongside Tre Mission and Cadell; following this news, Family Tree disbanded shortly after in early 2016.

Merky was a joint executive producer of Tizzy Gang's debut collaborative album, Opps Next Door Vol. 1, which was released on 16 June 2017. He provided vocals for fifteen of the album's twenty tracks, and produced many of its tracks under his Splurt Diablo alias. The album's release was celebrated with a launch party at Relentless No. 5 in London.

His debut solo album, War Is Normal, was released on 11 May 2018. The album features the singles "TDF", "Black Hawk Down", and "Out of Order", which were released on 9 March, 16 March, and 23 March 2018 respectively. The first two of these tracks had previously premiered on his SoundCloud in 2016, as had "Ruff's the New Buff", "Crash Bang Sound", and "What's the Program?".

On 5 June 2020, Merky marked his first collaboration with fellow grime MC Capo Lee with a joint project, the Clash of the Pagans EP.

Discography

Albums

Compilation albums

Mixtapes

EPs

Singles

As Splurt Diablo

Mixtapes and compilations

EPs

Awards and nominations

!
|-
| 2020
| rowspan="1"| Jme featuring Merky ACE - "Live"
| rowspan="1"| UK Music Video Awards Best Hip Hop / Grime / Rap Video
| 
| style="text-align:center;"|

References

Living people
Black British male rappers
British trap musicians
Dubstep musicians
English male rappers
English record producers
Grime music artists
Rappers from London
People from Lewisham
1997 births